Priddy Circles are a linear arrangement of four circular earthwork enclosures near the village of Priddy on the Mendip Hills in Somerset, England.  The circles have been listed as Scheduled Ancient Monuments, and described as 'probable Neolithic ritual or ceremonial monuments similar to a henge'.

The southernmost Priddy Circle falls on adjoining land to a house and stables that are owned by retired businessman Roger Penny. In 2012 Penny was fined £10,000 after the earthwork was damaged by work he had permitted.

Description
There is no missing enclosure in the gap between the northernmost enclosure and the others. This gap is bisected by the B3135 road and the course of the Roman road which runs between Charterhouse and Old Sarum.

The four circles each consist of a flat circular area surrounded by a bank and external ditch enclosure with more than one entrance. Excavations carried out between 1956 and 1959 by members of the University of Bristol Spelæological Society showed that the banks had stone cores with post and stake holes on either side. Geophysical surveys in 1995 and a magnetometer survey in 2006 are exploring further the make up of the circles.

The circles are numbered in sequence 1 to 4, with number 1 being the most southerly of the group. It has several gaps, but the one to the north-north-east was a causewayed entrance feature. There are three gaps present in this earthwork, and the one to the north-north-east is possibly an original feature. There are four gaps in this circle, the one to the south-south-west is considered an original entrance feature because it directly faces the north-north-west entrance of circle 2. Circle 4 has a diameter of up to 190 m but only two-thirds of the earthwork is present. Boreholes made in the 1950s suggested that the missing western section was never finished, possibly due to subsidence in the area. Associated with circle 4 is a group of mounds interpreted as barrows, one outside the circle to the west, and possibly four inside.

2011 damage
In June 2011, it was reported that English Heritage was investigating damage to the site, and during July 2011 photographs were published that appear to show significant damage to a section of the southernmost circle.

The owner of the southernmost ring, Roger Penny, was fined £10,000 and ordered to restore the earthwork at a cost of £38,000 following the damage caused by contractors he had hired.

Rubble had been used to fill important “swallet” holes in the ring, these have been described as natural cavities which may have been key to the monument’s creation. The workers also cleared gorse and bracken between April and October 2011, bringing rubble into the field to help rebuild a wall and moving a gate. In bringing in the rubble, ruts were made in the ground inside the circle by agricultural machinery. The damage included the destruction of a circular ditch said to be completely bulldozed. Penny was aware the ring was a scheduled monument and told the contractors not to touch it, but because part of the site is not visible to the naked eye "serious damage" was caused. English Heritage had not been consulted about the works. A spokeswoman for English Heritage described the damage as a "major incident", adding the structure was one of only about 80 henges in England. She said the loss of the fabric to the henge meant a "really, really rare piece of Neolithic engineering had been lost forever".

Interpretation
They are probably Neolithic ritual or ceremonial monuments similar to a henge but this interpretation is somewhat speculative due to the presence of external rather than internal ditches, a feature which makes them  unique in Britain.

Although no dating evidence has been found, they appear to be contemporary with Stonehenge, i.e. Neolithic circa 2500 BC - 2180 BC.

References

Populated places established in the 3rd millennium BC
Buildings and structures in Mendip District
Mendip Hills
History of Somerset
Neolithic settlements
Scheduled monuments in Mendip District
Archaeological sites in Somerset
Bronze Age sites in Somerset